Halcrow is a hamlet in northern Manitoba, Canada, about a mile east of Cormorant Lake on the eastern edge of the Cormorant Provincial Forest. It is in an unorganized area, one without incorporated municipalities or Indian reserves, in Division 21, Northern Region of Manitoba. Provincial Road 287 connects it to the west with Highway 10 with access to both Flin Flon to the north and The Pas to the south. It is a flag stop on Via Rail's Winnipeg – Churchill rail line.

Notes

Unincorporated communities in Northern Region, Manitoba